Trimethylaluminium is one of the simplest examples of an organoaluminium compound. Despite its name it has the formula Al2(CH3)6 (abbreviated as Al2Me6 or TMA), as it exists as a dimer.  This colorless liquid is pyrophoric. It is an industrially important compound, closely related to triethylaluminium.

Structure and bonding
The structure and bonding in Al2R6 and diborane are analogous (R = alkyl). In Al2Me6, the Al-C(terminal) and Al-C(bridging) distances are 1.97 and 2.14 Å, respectively. The Al center is tetrahedral. The carbon atoms of the bridging methyl groups are each surrounded by five neighbors: three hydrogen atoms and two aluminium atoms.  The methyl groups interchange readily intramolecularly. At higher temperatures, the dimer cracks into monomeric AlMe3.

Synthesis
TMA is prepared via a two-step process that can be summarized as follows:
2 Al + 6 CH3Cl + 6 Na → Al2(CH3)6 + 6 NaCl

Applications

Catalysis
Starting with the invention of Ziegler-Natta catalysis, organoaluminium compounds have a prominent role in the production of polyolefins, such as polyethylene and polypropylene. Methylaluminoxane, which is produced from TMA, is an activator for many transition metal catalysts.

Semiconductor applications
TMA is also used in semiconductor fabrication to deposit thin film, high-k dielectrics such as Al2O3 via the processes of chemical vapor deposition or atomic layer deposition. TMA is the preferred precursor for metalorganic vapour phase epitaxy (MOVPE) of aluminium-containing compound semiconductors, such as AlAs, AlN, AlP, AlSb, AlGaAs, AlInGaAs, AlInGaP, AlGaN, AlInGaN, AlInGaNP, etc. Criteria for TMA quality focus on (a) elemental impurities, (b) oxygenated and organic impurities.

Photovoltaic applications
In deposition processes very similar to semiconductor processing, TMA is used to deposit thin film, low-k (non-absorbing) dielectric layer stacks with Al2O3 via the processes of chemical vapor deposition or atomic layer deposition. The Al2O3 provides excellent surface passivation of p-doped silicon surfaces. The Al2O3 layer is typically the bottom layer with multiple silicon nitride (SixNy) layers for capping.

Reactions

Hydrolysis and related protonolysis reactions
Trimethylaluminium is  hydrolyzed readily, even dangerously:
Al2Me6 + 3 H2O → Al2O3 + 6 CH4
Under controlled conditions, the reaction can be stopped to give methylaluminoxane:
AlMe3 + H2O → 1/n [AlMeO]n + 2 CH4

Alcoholysis and aminolysis reactions proceed comparably. For example, dimethylamine gives the dialuminium diamide dimer:
2 AlMe3 + 2 HNMe2 → [AlMe2NMe2]2 + 2 CH4

Reactions with metal chlorides
TMA reacts with many metal halides to install alkyl groups. When combined with gallium trichloride, it gives trimethylgallium. Al2Me6 reacts with aluminium trichloride to give (AlMe2Cl)2.

TMA/metal halide reactions have emerged as reagents in organic synthesis.  Tebbe's reagent, which is used for the methylenation of esters and ketones, is prepared from TMA and titanocene dichloride. In combination with 20 to 100 mol % Cp2ZrCl2 (zirconocene dichloride), the (CH3)2Al-CH3 adds "across" alkynes to give vinyl aluminum species that are useful in organic synthesis in a reaction known as carboalumination.

Adducts
As for other "electron-deficient" compounds, trimethylaluminium gives adducts R3N.AlMe3. The Lewis acid properties of AlMe3 have been quantified. The enthalpy data show that AlMe3 is a hard acid and its acid parameters in the ECW model are EA =8.66 and CA = 3.68.

These adducts, e.g. the complex with the tertiary amine DABCO, are safer to handle than TMA itself.

The NASA ATREX mission (Anomalous Transport Rocket Experiment) employed the white smoke that TMA forms on air contact to study the high altitude jet stream.

Synthetic reagent
TMA is a source of methyl nucleophiles, akin to methyl lithium, but less reactive. It reacts with ketones to give, after a hydrolytic workup, tertiary alcohols.

Safety
Trimethylaluminium is pyrophoric, reacting violently with air and water.

References

External links

NASA ATREX mission article.

Organoaluminium compounds
Coordination complexes
Methyl complexes